Charles Claude Christophe Gourdan (1 November 1744, Champlitte - 2 August 1804, Champlitte) was a politician during the time of the French Revolution. He was one of the founders of the Jacobin Club.

The son of a lawyer, Claude Christophe Gourdan, and his wife Claire Raillard, he attended the University of Besançon also became a lawyer, and deputy criminal assessor of the bailiwick of Gray. At the convocation of the Estates General, he was elected deputy of the Third Estate of the :fr:Bailliage d'Amont. He consistently voted for radical initiatives, including the abolition of privileges, the creation of assignats, for the establishment of the new départements, for the sequestration of clerical property, the sale of national property, and the suppression of noble titles.

Under the Constituent Assembly, he served as President of the Champlitte District Court. Elected president of the National Convention from February 21 to March 7, 1793, he voted the death of the king. He then entered the Council of Five Hundred, and was a member of the Committee of Public Safety from October 7 to November 4, 1795. He entered the Council of Ancients of which he was also president. At the end of 1795, he was appointed judge of the Court of Cassation.

He argued against proposed restrictions on the re-establishment of banned political clubs, maintaining that the right of assembly could not be abrogated.  He was also a strong advocate of a free and uncensored press. Having opposed the Coup of 18 Brumaire he was ordered by Fouché to retired to the countryside. On 28 floréal year VIII (under the Consulate) he was appointed to the position of judge in the civil court of Vesoul, but declined to take up his post as he did not recognise a government established by force. He also resigned from his other judicial posts for the same reason.

He is buried in the cemetery of Rethel.

References

1744 births
1804 deaths
Regicides of Louis XVI
People on the Committee of Public Safety
Members of the Council of Ancients